The 2021 FIA World Rally Championship-3 was the eighth season of the World Rally Championship-3, an auto racing championship for rally cars that is recognised by the Fédération Internationale de l'Automobile as the third-highest tier of international rallying. It was open to privately entered cars complying with Group Rally2 regulations. The championship began in January 2021 with the Rallye Monte-Carlo and concluded in November 2021 with Rally Monza, running in support of the 2021 World Rally Championship.

Yohan Rossel won the driver's championship, while Maciek Szczepaniak took the co-driver's title.

The 2020 WRC-3 driver and co-driver champions Jari Huttunen and Mikko Lukka did not defend their titles in 2021 due to progression to WRC-2. Frenchman Yohan Rossel took the driver's title at the final round but due to his employing multiple co-drivers through the season, the co-driver title went to Maciek Szczepaniak, regular co-driver to Kajetan Kajetanowicz.

The 2021 WRC-3 season was the last to use Group Rally2 cars. From 2022 the championship would use only Group Rally3 cars.

Calendar

Entries
The following crews have entered, or will enter, the 2021 World Championship-3:

Changes

Technical regulations
Pirelli will become the WRC's sole tyre supplier following the removal of Michelin and Yokohama from the approved tyre supplier list. Under the terms of the agreement, Pirelli will supply tyres to all crews entering in four-wheel drive cars.

Sporting regulations
Competitors in the WRC-3 category will be awarded Power Stage bonus points for the first time.

Results and standings

Season summary

Scoring system
Points were awarded to the top ten classified finishers in each event. There were also five bonus points awarded to the winners of the Power Stage, four points for second place, three for third, two for fourth and one for fifth. Crews were only allowed to enter a maximum of 7 events with the 5 best results scoring points in the championship.

FIA World Rally Championship-3 for Drivers

FIA World Rally Championship-3 for Co-Drivers

Notes

References

External links
  
 FIA World Rally Championship-3 2021 at eWRC-results.com

 
World Rally Championship-3